Kosta Runjaić (born 4 June 1971) is a German football manager who serves as the manager of the Polish side Legia Warsaw.

Managerial statistics

References

External links
 

1971 births
Living people
Footballers from Vienna
Austrian emigrants to Germany
Naturalized citizens of Germany
German people of Croatian descent
Austrian people of Croatian descent
Association footballers not categorized by position
German footballers
Austrian footballers
FSV Frankfurt players
German football managers
Austrian football managers
VfR Aalen managers
SV Darmstadt 98 managers
MSV Duisburg managers
1. FC Kaiserslautern managers
TSV 1860 Munich managers
Pogoń Szczecin managers
Legia Warsaw managers
2. Bundesliga managers
3. Liga managers
Ekstraklasa managers
German expatriate football managers
Austrian expatriate football managers
Expatriate football managers in Poland
German expatriate sportspeople in Poland